Tirol is a comune (municipality) in the province of South Tyrol in northern Italy, located about  northwest of the city of Bolzano.

Geography

Tirol borders the following municipalities: Kuens, Algund, Merano, Moos in Passeier, Partschins, Riffian, and Schenna.

The name of the historical region of Tyrol stems from the Castle Tyrol, which is located in the village.

Frazioni
The municipality of Tirol contains the frazione (subdivision) St. Peter (San Pietro).

History

Coat-of-arms
The coat shows an eagle of gules on argent background, surmounted by a vert lime branch. The insignia has medieval origins and was the coat of the Counts of Tirol who took their name from Tirol Castle. The emblem was granted in 1970 when the branch was added.

Society

Linguistic distribution
According to the 2011 census, 96.89% of the population speak German, 2.89% Italian and 0.22% Ladin as first language.

Demographic evolution

References

External links
 Homepage of the municipality

Municipalities of South Tyrol